Mario Noris (born 2 December 1958) is an Italian former racing cyclist, who competed as a professional from 1978 to 1988. He most notably won the Giro di Toscana in 1979 and the Giro di Puglia in 1983. After retiring from road racing, he competed in mountain biking and won the silver medal in the cross-country race at the 1990 European Mountain Bike Championships.

Major results

Road

1977
 1st Circuito del Porto
1979
 1st Giro di Toscana
1980
 6th Giro di Toscana
 10th Gran Premio Città di Camaiore
 10th Coppa Ugo Agostoni
1981
 8th Milano–Vignola
1982
 2nd Trofeo Laigueglia
 6th Tre Valli Varesine
 9th Trofeo Pantalica
1983
 1st Overall Giro di Puglia
1st Stage 3
 2nd Giro dell'Etna
 3rd Giro di Campania
 7th Trofeo Pantalica
 9th Overall Giro di Sardegna
1987
 6th Grand Prix Cerami
 10th Overall Settimana Internazionale di Coppi e Bartali
1988
 6th Grand Prix Cerami

Grand Tour general classification results timeline

MTB
1990
 7th UCI World XCO Championships
1991
 2nd  European XCO Championships

References

External links

1958 births
Living people
Italian male cyclists
Italian mountain bikers
People from Albino, Lombardy
Cyclists from the Province of Bergamo